"How I Wet Your Mother" is the sixteenth episode of the twenty-third season of the American animated television series The Simpsons. It originally aired on the Fox network in the United States on March 11, 2012. In the episode, a traumatic incident causes Homer to repeatedly wet the bed. As it worsens, his family, with the help of Professor Frink, successfully manage to infiltrate his dreams to get to its subconscious source. The episode name is a pun on How I Met Your Mother.

The episode was co-written by Billy Kimball and Ian Maxtone-Graham and has received positive reviews from critics.

Plot 
Waylon Smithers enters a storage cupboard in the power plant and accidentally leaves the door open. Homer, seeing this as an opportunity to steal supplies, tells everyone to come and help themselves, and every employee steals something. However, Homer then sees Mr. Burns approaching and hurries away from the plant, leaving his fellow employees to get all the blame. Homer is thought to be the only one who did not steal anything and gets a day off, which he spends going fishing with Bart. The next night, Homer wets the bed while asleep. When he wets the bed again the following night, he thinks that karma may be the reason, so he apologizes to all of his fellow employees with a free barbecue for everyone. That night, Homer wets the bed again and gets angry over a wasted act of kindness. He buys a bedwetting alarm that will warn him when he is about to urinate in his sleep. This machine, however, wakes up the entire family, and he must explain his predicament to them. Homer then starts wearing Confidence Man Adult Diapers, which are a turn-off to Marge, and she goes for a walk. She bumps into Professor Frink, who reveals that he has invented a machine that can be used to enter other people's dreams. They plug in Homer while he is asleep and the family enters his dream in which he is skiing down a snowy mountain. There, they meet Death, who is dragging a coffin that reads "Marriage". After falling off a cliff while pursuing Death, and faced with Frink's warning that their death in the dream world could kill them in real life, they use the dream machine to enter Bart's dream to prolong their time. In this dream, the family is drawn in their original style from The Tracey Ullman Show, with Homer using his original Walter Matthau-style voice. Family therapist B.F. Sherwood tells them to open the coffin. When it is opened, the room starts to fill with fish, so the family use the machine to go to the next dream, which is Lisa's, but when they find that they are on an Elizabethan stage show, they immediately change dreams again, much to Lisa's protests of being ignored, going back into Homer's.

Homer's newest dream depicts a city made of his greatest desires. After exploring the dream, Homer decides he wants to stay in it forever. At this point, Chief Wiggum, Eddie, and Lou enter the Simpsons' home to try to get the dream machine from Frink, ignoring his warnings that this could kill the Simpsons. In the resulting fight, the dream machine falls to the floor, which causes a disturbance in the dream, in which a large bottle of Duff Beer falls over and floods the city. The Simpsons are nearly crushed by two large gears, but they are rescued by Death, who is revealed to be Mona Simpson, Homer's mother who passed away four seasons prior. Mona then takes the family to a movie theater, where they view a childhood memory of Homer's. He and Grampa went on a fishing trip and the boat capsized. They then returned to their holiday home several hours late and without any fish. A couple of weeks following the incident, Mona left Grampa and Homer. This left Homer guilty, as he thought that the failed fishing trip caused his mother to leave. However, Mona reassures him that it was not because of this and shows another memory of her being relieved that Homer, her greatest treasure, was safe because of Grampa, and Homer finally feels comfort. Now knowing the reason behind Homer's bed-wetting, the family leaves the dream before it collapses on itself. Back at the Simpson home, Wiggum finally manages to get the device from Frink and detaches it just as everyone wakes up. Homer is relieved to find he has not wet himself. That night, Homer spins a top, with Marge telling him that if it keeps spinning, they are still in a dream. It does, so they strip naked and go for a bike ride. However, as soon as they leave, the top falls on its side, and it starts to hail; a truck then hits Homer.

Production
"How I Wet Your Mother" is written by Billy Kimball and Ian Maxtone-Graham and was directed by Lance Kramer. The title of the episode is a reference to the TV show, How I Met Your Mother. The plot spoofs the film Inception, with various scenes parodying certain moments from the film. The episode is also the fourth to feature the character of Mona Simpson, who had previously died in "Mona Leaves-a". The name of character B.F. Sherwood is a parody of American psychologist B.F. Skinner.

Reception
The episode is the third least watched episode in the history of The Simpsons, having only 4.97 million viewers in the United States. It was the second most watched program on FOX that night.

Hayden Childs, of The A.V. Club, was positive on the episode noting that "Although it never reaches outright hilarity, ‘How I Wet Your Mother’ is one of the more interesting episodes of this season." He further noted that only having one major plot was a good idea and several good jokes in the episode. He rated the episode a B+.

References

External links 
 
 "How I Wet Your Mother" at theSimpsons.com

The Simpsons (season 23) episodes
2012 American television episodes
Television episodes about dreams